Čarapić is a surname found in Serbia and Croatia. The root of the word is čarapa, .

A former noble  lived in Grocka nahija (Belgrade region). Members of the family participated in the Serbian Revolution and the subsequent government of the Principality of Serbia. The family descended from the Vujanović brotherhood in Kuči (modern Montenegro), and had settled Grocka in ca. 1750.

The surname Čarapić may refer to:

Ana Čarapić (born 1985), Serbian politician
Đorđe Čarapić (1773-1826), Serbian military leader
Ilija Čarapić (1792–1844), mayor of Belgrade
Ognjen Čarapić (born 1998), Montenegrin basketball player
Tanasije Čarapić (1770–1810), Serbian duke
Tom Carapic (born 1939), found object artist
Uroš Čarapić (born 1996), Serbian basketball player 
Vasa Čarapić (1768–1806), Serbian revolutionary

Serbian surnames
Serbian families
Serb families
Croatian surnames